Walter Edward Callander (born 30 May 1947) is a Bahamian sprinter. He competed in the men's 100 metres at the 1972 Summer Olympics.

References

External links
 

1947 births
Living people
Athletes (track and field) at the 1971 Pan American Games
Athletes (track and field) at the 1972 Summer Olympics
Athletes (track and field) at the 1975 Pan American Games
Athletes (track and field) at the 1976 Summer Olympics
Bahamian male sprinters
Olympic athletes of the Bahamas
Place of birth missing (living people)
Pan American Games competitors for the Bahamas